Primera A may refer to:
Colombian Primera A, Colombia
Serie A de Ecuador, Ecuador
Liga de Expansión MX or Primera División A, Mexico
Liga Nacional de Ascenso or Primera A, Panama